Duro may refer to:

Duro (monetary unit), a nickname for the five peseta coin
Duro v. Reina (1990), a U.S. Supreme Court case
Samir Duro, Bosnian footballer
Ibrahim Duro, Bosnian footballer
Duro (Star Wars), a fictional planet in the Star Wars franchise
the Mowag Duro, a wheeled military vehicle produced by MOWAG
includes the Duro III
Showtek (Sjoerd Janssen), Dutch DJ sometimes called DJ Duro
Ken Duro Ifill, American audio engineer
Duros (food)

See also
 Duros (disambiguation)
 Đuro